Davis Township is one of twelve townships in Caldwell County, Missouri, and is part of the Kansas City metropolitan area with the USA.  At the 2000 census, its population was 1,296.

Davis Township has the name of John T. and Samuel D. Davis, pioneer settlers.

Geography

The streams of North Mud Creek and Willow Creek run through the township.

Transportation
Davis Township contains one airport or landing strip, Wright Landing Field.

References

External links
 US-Counties.com
 City-Data.com

Townships in Caldwell County, Missouri
Townships in Missouri